HMS Derby was a Hunt-class minesweeper of the Aberdare sub-class built for the Royal Navy during World War I. She was not finished in time to participate in the First World War and survived the Second World War to be sold for scrap in 1946.

Design and description
The Aberdare sub-class were enlarged versions of the original Hunt-class ships with a more powerful armament. The ships displaced  at normal load. The ships' complement consisted of 74 officers and ratings.

The ships had two vertical triple-expansion steam engines, each driving one shaft, using steam provided by two Yarrow boilers.

The Aberdare sub-class was armed with a quick-firing (QF)  gun forward of the bridge and a QF twelve-pounder (76.2 mm) anti-aircraft gun aft. Some ships were fitted with six- or three-pounder guns in lieu of the twelve-pounder. Ships that served in the Second World War initially had two machine guns installed in the bridge wings. Later the four-inch gun was replaced by another twelve-pounder and the machine guns were replaced by Oerlikon 20 mm cannon. Later still another pair of Oerlikons was mounted in the stern.

Construction and career
She was originally to be named Dawlish, but was renamed before launch to avoid possible misunderstandings of having vessels named after coastal locations.

See also
Derby

Notes

References
 
 
 
 

 

Hunt-class minesweepers (1916)
Royal Navy ship names
1918 ships